Dirty Linen is a Philippine drama television series broadcast by Kapamilya Channel. Directed by Onat Diaz and Andoy Ranay, it stars Janine Gutierrez, Zanjoe Marudo, Seth Fedelin and Francine Diaz. The series premiered on the network's Primetime Bida evening block, Jeepney TV, A2Z Primetime Weeknights, and TV5's Todo Max Primetime Singko, and worldwide via The Filipino Channel on January 23, 2023, replacing the re-runs of Flower of Evil.

Premise
A nanny, a driver, and two laundrywomen of a wealthy, aristocratic family mysteriously vanish one by one without a trace. Years later, the four houseworkers’ respective family members & loved ones are out to get their hellish revenge against the prominent family itself. To exact vengeance, they infiltrate the household under different identities in order to expose their dirty secrets. However, an encounter with the family’s eldest son in the past will lead to obstacles getting in the way of the revenge plot.

Cast and characters
Main cast
Janine Gutierrez as Alexa D. Salvacion / Mila dela Cruz
Zanjoe Marudo as Aidan R. Fiero
Francine Diaz as Chiara D. Fiero
Seth Fedelin as Nico M. Sinag

Supporting cast
Joel Torre as Rolando "Olan" Sinag / Abe Matias
Tessie Tomas as Doña Cielo Flores-Fiero
John Arcilla as Carlos F. Fiero
Janice de Belen as Leona Roque-Fiero
Angel Aquino as Feliz F. Fiero-Pavia
Epy Quizon as Salvador "Ador" Pavia
JC Santos as Police Lt. Lemuel Onore
Christian Bables as Max Dionisio
Jennica Garcia as Lalaine "Lala" Millado
Xyriel Manabat as Antonette "Tonet" F. Pavia
Raven Rigor as Clint F. Pavia

Recurring cast
Andrea del Rosario as Atty. Olga Arguelles
Rubi Rubi as Precious Magtibay
Tart Carlos as Marisol
CJ Navato as Dennis
Rans Rifol as Stella Baldomar
Apey Obera as Glory
Angelica Lao as Bella
Lance Carr as Matt
Sean Tristan as Ace
Hazel Orencio as Marites
Raphael Robes as Meneses
Kert Montante as Larry

Guest cast
Dolly de Leon as Olivia de Mesa-Salvacion
Susan Africa as Pilar Onore
Soliman Cruz as Alejandro Isidro
Ruby Ruiz as Lydia Millado
Arnold Reyes as Diego Salvacion
Liza Diño as Riza Manalo-Sinag
Karl Medina as Noel Dionisio
Ping Medina as Hector Tantoco
Erika Clemente as young Alexa
Enzo Pelojero as young Aidan
JJ Quilantang as young Max
Althea Ruedas as young Lala

Production
On May 17, 2022, Dreamscape Entertainment confirmed the casting of Dirty Linen leads Janine Gutierrez, Zanjoe Marudo, Francine Diaz, and Seth Fedelin. Principal photography commenced in July 2022.

Reception
With more than 40,000 tweets, the series' official hashtag was among the top trending topics in the Philippines as the pilot aired on Monday (January 23). Dirty Linen has accumulated over 500 million combined views across all leading social media platforms within its ten episodes.

Critical reception
Manila Standard gave the series a positive review, hailing it a "new benchmark for PH drama series". It was also noted for its "compelling plot, suspenseful scenes, detail-oriented production and script, and a star-studded cast". Among the standouts includes Xyriel Manabat, who was praised for her acting prowess and became one of the most talked about characters in the series online.

Ratings
According to the Nielsen NUTAM People Survey, Dirty Linen performed decently. Despite having limited reach on free television, Dirty Linen debuted with 3.6% rating, beating one of its timeslot rivals Poong, the Joseon Psychiatrist. The following episode, the series scored a 4.8% rating and ended its pilot week on Friday, January 27 with a rating of 4.2%.

Episodes
<onlyinclude>

Music
The theme song is titled "Simulan" and is performed by KICE.

References

Notes

External links

ABS-CBN original programming
Philippine crime television series
Philippine action television series
Serial killers in television
Works about corruption
Television series about organized crime
Murder in television
Television series about revenge
Philippine thriller television series
Psychological thriller television series
Philippine mystery television series
2020s Philippine television seasons
2023 Philippine television series debuts